"I'll Do Anything It Takes (To Stay with You)" is a single by American country music artist Jean Shepard written by Curly Putman, Larry Butler and Jan Crutchfield. Released in May 1974, it was the second single from the album I'll Do Anything It Takes.  The song reached #17 on the Billboard Hot Country Singles chart

Chart performance

References 

1974 singles
Jean Shepard songs
Song recordings produced by Larry Butler (producer)
1974 songs
United Artists Records singles
Songs written by Curly Putman
Songs written by Larry Butler (producer)
Songs written by Jan Crutchfield